Toward an Anthropological Theory of Value: The False Coin of Our Own Dreams is a 2002 book-length synthesis of cultural, economic, and political theories of value, written by anthropologist David Graeber and published by Palgrave.

A Spanish translation is slated for release in October 2018.

References

Further reading

External links 

 
 eBook chapters

2002 non-fiction books
American non-fiction books
Anthropology books
Books by David Graeber
English-language books
Palgrave Macmillan books